Epitoky is a process that occurs in many species of polychaete marine worms wherein a sexually immature worm (the atoke) is modified or transformed into a sexually mature worm (the epitoke). Epitokes are pelagic morphs capable of sexual reproduction. Unlike the immature form, which is typically benthic (lives on the bottom), epitokes are specialized for swimming as well as reproducing. The primary benefit to epitoky is increased chances of finding other members of the same species for reproduction.

There are two methods in which epitoky can occur:  schizogamy and epigamy.

Schizogamy

Many species go through schizogamy, where the atoke uses asexual reproduction to produce buds from its posterior end. Each bud develops into an epitoke and, once fully formed, will then break off from the atoke and become free-swimming. Many genetically identical epitokes are formed in this way, thus allowing a higher chance of finding a mate of the same species and subsequent passing of genes to the next generation. Atokes may then live through another season to form more epitokes.

Epigamy

Epigamy is another common way to form epitokes. For species that use this method, the atoke undergoes physiological and morphological modifications as it transforms into the epitoke. Typically, male worms undergo a more pronounced transformation from atoke to epitoke. Modifications may include an increase in size of parapodia and the development of paddle-like chaetae for enhanced swimming ability, atrophy of the gut, filling of the body cavity with gametes (eggs or sperm), the development of large eyes, and the musculature may even change to perform swimming movements instead of feeding movements. The majority of species that undergo epigamy are unable to revert to the atoke form and die after reproducing.

Male and female epitokes are produced and swim to the water's surface only at certain times of the year and are often synchronized with moon cycles in a behavior called swarming. Swarming brings individuals of the same species together so that there is an increased rate of fertilization. Some polychaete species have been found to use bioluminescence, presumably to compact and maintain swarms. Both schizogamous and epigamous epitokes are non-feeding individuals that die once gametes have been released into the water.

In the past, epitokes were thought to be a separate group of polychaete marine worms, because epitokes may look very different than atokes. For instance, the atokes of Platynereis dumerilii are yellowish-brown, while the female epitokes are yellow because of the eggs they contain, and the male epitokes are white in the front part due to sperm and red in the hind part due to blood vessels (see pictures).

References 

Reproduction in animals
Asexual reproduction